Ovide Alakannuark (December 25, 1938 – October 7, 2019) was a Canadian territorial level politician from Pelly Bay, Northwest Territories (now Kugaaruk, Nunavut). He served as a member of the Legislative Assembly of Nunavut from 1999 until 2004.

Alakannuark was elected in the 1999 Nunavut general election. He defeated candidate Steve Mapsalak by just 25 votes to win the Akulliq electoral district. He only served a single term in the Legislature deciding not to run for re-election when it was dissolved in 2004.

He attempted a return to politics running in rerun for the Akulliq district finishing a distant third on March 2, 2009. The two front runners Steve Mapsalak and John Ningark had also served as MLAs in the Nunavut Legislature. He died on October 7, 2019 at the age of 80.

References

Members of the Legislative Assembly of Nunavut
21st-century Canadian politicians
People from Kugaaruk
Inuit from the Northwest Territories
Inuit politicians
1938 births
Inuit from Nunavut
2019 deaths